Asian underground is a term associated with various British Asian and South Asian Canadian musicians (mostly Indian, Pakistani, Bangladeshi and Sri Lankan) who blend elements of Western underground dance music and the traditional Asian music of their home countries in South Asia. The sound has roots in the South Asian Diaspora, and many notable musicians within the genre are immigrants or children of immigrants. The first well-known mention was the compilation album Anokha - Soundz of the Asian Underground released in 1997 and masterminded by Talvin Singh and Sweety Kapoor. It is not a strict musical genre per se, since the specific sounds can vary wildly (from Cornershop's Bollywood-influenced Britpop to Panjabi MCs' bhangra-influenced jungle).

History
In the 1980s, performances of folk music evolved into the bhangra music genre, which would later become more mainstream in the 1990s and 2000s. In the 1990s, Asian underground was considered hip and broke through to the mainstream, with artists such as Apache Indian and Cornershop frequently entering the UK charts, with the former's "Boom Shack-A-Lak" (1993) appearing in many popular movies and the latter topping the charts with "Brimful of Asha" in 1998. The genre and other forms of South Asian music began to influence Europe's pop mainstream as acts like Björk, Erasure, and Siouxsie and the Banshees all released singles or remixes featuring South Asian instrumentation. Talvin Singh, known for his innovative fusion of Indian classical music with drum and bass, subsequently won a Mercury Music Prize for his album OK in 1999.

Asian underground music initially had only little influence on popular Indian music on the sub-continent, where it was usually branded under world music. While several Asian underground artists such as Apache Indian, Trickbaby and Bally Sagoo gained fame in India, it was only after Panjabi MC's international hit "Mundian To Bach Ke" that British-Asian underground music could compete with domestic Indian artists like Shankar Mahadevan and Remo Fernandes, in addition to attracting worldwide audiences. It was followed by the globally successful Rishi Rich Project, consisting of producer Rishi Rich and artists Jay Sean, Mumzy Stranger, Juggy D and Veronica Mehta. They were one of the first groups to fuse Bhangra music with contemporary R&B and found tremendous success in India after their songs were featured in mainstream Bollywood soundtracks such as Boom, Kya Kool Hai Hum and Hum Tum. Since then, Asian underground music has exerted some influence on mainstream Indian pop music.

Asian underground music has also influenced mainstream American hip hop, R&B and urban music in the 2000s, including artists such as Timbaland, Truth Hurts, Jay-Z, Snoop Dogg, Missy Elliott and Britney Spears. According to DJ Green Lantern, "Indian beats have now become a fixture on the R&B scene". Music produced by the Asian Dub Foundation has also been featured on the soundtracks for popular video games such as Need For Speed Underground. Several former Asian underground artists such as M.I.A. and Jay Sean have gone on to achieve mainstream success in the North American music industry, where they produced mainstream songs such as "Paper Planes" and "Down" that have charted highly on (and in the latter case, topped) the Billboard Hot 100.

Primary instruments
Asian underground uses many traditional and relatively new instruments. Its primary ones are sitar and tabla, and almost all artists use an electronic or acoustic drum kit and/or synthesizer. Some groups like Tabla Beat Science use an electric bass. Various other instruments, including the dholak, sarangi, and bansuri are also sometimes used. Vocals can be found as an instrument of emotional expression on many Asian underground recordings.

Notable artists

 Kelli Ali
 Anik Khan
 Suzana Ansar
 Apache Indian
 Asian Dub Foundation
 Badmarsh & Shri
 Bandish Projekt
 Bat for Lashes
 Biddu
 Black Star Liner
 Niraj Chag
 Dhol Foundation
 Bobby Friction
 Fun-Da-Mental
 Heems
 Joi
 Karsh Kale
 Loop Guru
 M.I.A.
 MIDIval Punditz
 Anuj Rastogi
 Veronica Mehta
 Cheb i Sabbah
 Gurdeep Samra
 Iraj Weeraratne
 Pragathi Guruprasad
 Nitin Sawhney
 Talvin Singh
 State of Bengal
 Suphala
 Tabla Beat Science
 Transglobal Underground
 Trilok Gurtu
jai uttal
Vraja
Daniel Masson
Amar (singer)
Aki Nawaz
DCS

Notable labels
 Axiom Records
 Nation Records
 Shiva Soundsystem
 Six Degrees Records

Notable compilations
 Anokha - Soundz of the Asian Underground
 Eastern Uprising - Music from the Asian Underground, compiled by Earthtribe, released on Sony/Higherground
 Indian Electronica volume 001, compiled by Qasim Virjee a.k.a. Abdul Smooth

See also
 World fusion music

References

External links
 Guide to Asian Underground
 Documentary film about Asian Underground and Bhangra

20th-century music genres
Electronic dance music genres
British Pakistani history
South Asian music
Asian Underground